Club Brugge KV is a Belgian professional football team formed in 1891. Throughout its history the club's first team has competed in various national and international competitions. All players who have played in 50 or more such matches are listed below.

Key
Players with name in bold currently play for the club.
Years are the first and last calendar years in which the player appeared in competitive first-team football for the club.
League appearances and goals comprise those in the Belgian First Division A and its predecessors of top-level league football in Belgium.
Total appearances and goals comprise those in the Belgian First Division A, Belgian First Division A Playoffs, Belgian Cup, Belgian League Cup, Belgian Super Cup, UEFA Europa League, UEFA Europa League and several now-defunct competitions.

Players with 50 or more appearances
Appearances and goals are for first-team competitive matches only. Substitute appearances are included. Statistics are correct as of 1 May 2017.

Position key:
GK – Goalkeeper; 
DF – Defender;
MF – Midfielder;
FW – Forward

C
 Robert Caenen (?)
 Eddy Caers (1974–1975)
 Charles Cambier (?)
 Marcos Camozzato (2010–)
 Brecht Capon (2001–2009)
 Willy Carbo (June 1983 – December 1983)
 Berten Carels (1941–1956)
 Yves Carette (1981–1984)
 Pierre Carteus (1966–1974)
 Nastja Čeh (2001–2005)
 Walter Ceulemans (1981–1983)
 Daniel Chavez (2006–2010)
 Hans Christiaens (1989–1991)
 Laurent Ciman (2008–2009)
 Gert Claessens (1994–1999)
 Ray Clarke (June 1979 – December 1979)
 Philippe Clement (1999–2009)
 Yvan Clicteur (1961–1963)
 Lei Clijsters (1973–1975)
 Antoine Coly (1984–1990)
 Julien Cools (1973–1979)
 Colin Coosemans (2010–)
 Lucien Coppens (1959–1960)
 Hans Cornelis (1999–2005)
 Rudi Cossey (1990–1995)
 Paul Courant (1976–1981)
 Francis Couvreur (1988–1991)
 Peter Creve (1986–1995)

D
 Koen Daerden (2006 – December 2009)
 Mohamed Dahmane (2009–2010)
 Wilfried Dalmat (2010–)
 Tomas Danilevičius (1996 – December 1997, January 1999 – 1999)
 Guy Dardenne (1981–1984)
 Raoul Daufresne de la Chevalerie (1908–1912)
 Tomas Daumantas (1997–1998)
 Roger Davies (June 1976 – November 1977)
 Louis Debackere (1957–1965)
 Eric De Baets (1977–1978)
 Alex De Block (1960–1961)
 Jacky Debougnoux (1979–1984)
 Tjörven De Brul (1994–2003)
 Glenn Decaestecker (1997–1999, 2000–2001)
 Dwight Decerf (1985–1986)
 Noël De Cock (1961–1966)
 Olivier De Cock (1987–2007)
 Björn De Coninck (1988–1998)
 Freddy De Coninck (1966–1972)
 Daniël De Cubber (1975–1979, 1981–1984)
 Eric Deflandre (1996–2000)
 Robert De Grande (1972–1975)
 Armand De Groote (1958–1962)
 Marc Degryse (1980–1989)
 Kurt De Laere (?-2003)
 Wim Delbaere (1981–1983)
 Gerard Delbeke (1923–1933)
 Fernand Delzongle (1959–1960)
 Gertjan De Mets (1997–2011)
 Erik De Mey (1970–1975)
 Willy De Mey (1970–1973)
 Georges Demoor (1967–1968)
 Norbert De Naeghel (1969–1977)
 Nicolas Denys (1999–2000)
 Werner Deprez (1966–1967)
 Jan De Ruyter (1988–1989)
 Gilbert Dermul (1972–1983)
 Fries Deschilder (2011–)
 Chris Desmet (1961–1966)
 Tom De Sutter (2001–2005)
 Stephane De Taeye (1973–1975)
 Robert Deurwaerder (1957–1966)
 Robert De Veen (?)
 Geert De Vlieger (2008–2011)
 Edmond De Vos (1956–1962)
 Geert De Vriendt (1972–1974)
 Johan Devrindt (1972–1974)
 Luc Devroe (1986–1988)
 Pascal De Wilde (1984–1985)
 Jimmy De Wulf (1991–2001, November 2001 – 2003)
 Sven Dhoest (2011–)
 Maxime Dhoore Gnimassou (1994–2000)
 Moustapha Diallo (2006–2007)
 Junior Diaz (2010–)
 Nabil Dirar (2008–)
 László Disztl (1989–1994)
 Dušan Đokić (2007–2010)
 Timothy Dreesen (2006–2009)
 José Duarte (2000–2003)
 Johan Dubois (1970–1971)
 Grégory Dufer (2005–2007)
 Tomasz Dziubinski (1991–1995)
 Armin Derhami (since 2019)

E
 Elos Elonga Ekakia (1998–1999)
 Gaëtan Englebert (1999–2008)
 Bernt Evens (2008–2009)

F
 Khalilou Fadiga (1997–2000)

G
 Hans Galjé (1990–1994)
 Ruud Geels (1972–1974)
 Karel Geraerts (1998 – December 2003, 2007–)
 Hector "Torten" Goetinck (1902–1928)
 Henri Gogne (1976–1979)
 Willy Goossens (1967–1968)
 Fernand Goyvaerts (1956–1962)
 Jan Goyvaerts (1987–1988)
 Rob Grüben (1979–1981)
 Ivan Gvozdenović (2003–2007)

H
 Roland Haeyen (1964–1966)
 Pierre Havermaet (1964–1965)
 Roger Hermans (1972–1974)
 Sebastian Hermans (2001–2006)
 Wiver Hernandes (1994–1996)
 Marcel Herssens (?)
 Brian Hill (1967–1968)
 Dirk Hinderyckx (1973–1977)
 Freddy Hinderyckx (1962–1972)
 Kurt Hinderyckx (1986–1989)
 Luc Hinderyckx (1980–1985)
 Carl Hoefkens (2009–)
 Werner Hoffmann (1962–1963)
 Konrad Holenstein (1975–1976)
 Peter Houtman (November 1978 – May 1979)
 Henkie Houwaart jr. (1984–1988)
 Henk Houwaart sr. (1969–1975)

I
 Salou Ibrahim (2006–2008)
 Aleksandar Ilić (1997–2000)
 Manasseh Ishiaku (January 2005 – 2007)

J
 Alandson Jansen da Silva (2008)
 Alexandre Jansen Da Silva (2008)
 Jochen Janssen (1999 – December 2000)
 Jared Jeffrey (2008 – December 2009)
 Birger Jensen (1974–1988)

K
 Michael Klukowski (2005–2010)
 Dorge Kouemaha (2009–)
 Marc-André Kruska (2009)
 Stepan Kucera (2007–2010)
 Vladan Kujović (2011–)

L
 Raoul "Lotte" Lambert (1956–1980)
 Rune Lange (2001–2006)
 Georges Leekens (1972–1981)
 Ivan Leko (2005–2009)
 Yves Lenaerts (2006–2010)
 Benjamin Lutun (2004–2007)
 Maxime Lestienne (2010–)

M
 Thomas Meunier (2011–)

O
 Vadis Odjidja-Ofoe (2009–)

P
 Désiré Paternoster (1901–1905 en 1908–1911)
 Lothaire Pierets (?)

V
 Edgard Van Boxtaele (1907–1914)
 Emiel Van den Berghe (?)
 Léon Vandevoorde (?)
 Roger Vanhove (1930–1939)
 Marcel Van Vyve (?)
 Louis Versyp (?)

References
General
Belgian Soccer Database

Specific

Club Brugge
Association football player non-biographical articles